Franz III. Nádasdy (Hungarian - Nádasdy III. Ferenc; 14 January 1622 – 30 April 1671) was a chief judge and general in Hungary. He was one of the leaders of the Magnate conspiracy against Holy Roman Emperor Leopold I. After the conspiracy was revealed, he and two other leaders (Petar Zrinski and Petar's brother-in-law Fran Krsto Frankopan) were all executed.

Life
He was descended from two royal houses. He was not only descended from a son of Edward I of England who had settled in Hungary, but also the grandson of Ferenc Nádasdy. His grandmother Elizabeth Báthory (the infamous Bloody Countess of Csejte Castle) came from the noble Báthory family.

Nádasdy converted to Roman Catholicism on 25 November 1643 in order to marry countess Anna Juliana Esterházy, daughter of Nikolaus, Count Esterházy, on 6 February the following year. After the Hungarian Diet in Pressburg decided upon the return of the County of Hornstein to the Kingdom of Hungary, Nádasdy ordered Rudolf von Stotzingen to dismiss his mercenaries.

Bibliography (in German) 
 Genealogisches Taschenbuch der deutschen gräflichen Häuser aus dem Jahr 1825. Gotha 1825
 Albert Gernot Absenger: Chronik Neufeld III, Verdichtung der gesamten Ortshistorie als Folge- und Erweiterungsband von Lang- und Kurzfassung der 2002 erschienen chronikartigen Darstellung Stadtgemeinde Neufeld an der Leitha, Neufeld an der Leitha 2007.
 Kálmán Benda: Nádasdy, Ferenc Graf, in: Biographisches Lexikon zur Geschichte Südosteuropas. Bd. 3. München 1979, S. 284 f.

References

External links 
 Nádasdy-Familienseite
 Heimatmuseum Rother Hof Pottendorf: Nadasdy (aufgerufen am 25. Oktober 2014)
 

1622 births
1671 deaths
Hungarian nobility
Counts
17th-century executions
People executed by Austria
Franz III
People of the Habsburg monarchy